"Firework" is a song by American singer Katy Perry from her third studio album, Teenage Dream (2010). Perry co-wrote the song with Ester Dean and the song's producers Stargate and Sandy Vee. It is a dance-pop self-empowerment anthem with inspirational lyrics, and Perry felt it was an important song for her on the record. Capitol Records released it as the album's third single on October 26, 2010.

The song was commercially successful, reaching number one on the Billboard Hot 100 and the top five on 20 charts around the world. "Firework" has sold over 1 million copies in the United Kingdom and was certified 12× platinum by the Recording Industry Association of America (RIAA) for shipments of over 12 million copies in the United States. "'Firework" received mixed to positive reviews from critics upon release, lauding Perry's vocals but finding the lyrics "clunky".

An accompanying music video, directed by Dave Meyers, was released on October 28, 2010. It portrays Perry singing and dancing around Budapest, with interspersed scenes of young people becoming confident in themselves. An open casting call for the music video drew an unprecedented 38,000 applicants. On MuchMusic's top 50 videos of 2010, "Firework" reached the top position. The music video was said to be a more upbeat take on Christina Aguilera's message in "Beautiful". It was nominated for three awards at the 2011 MTV Video Music Awards, eventually winning one of those, the Video of the Year, the main and final award. "Firework" was nominated for Record of the Year and Best Pop Solo Performance at the 54th Grammy Awards. On January 5, 2012, "Firework" was elected the fifth most played single on US radio during 2011 by Nielsen Broadcast Data Systems, with 509,000 plays.

Production and composition

"Firework" was written by Perry, Stargate, Sandy Wilhelm, and Ester Dean while produced by Stargate and Sandy Vee at Soapbox Studios in Atlanta, Georgia. It was recorded at Roc the Mic Studios. It was mixed at The Bunker Studios by Vee. Audio engineering was done by Carlos Oyanedel and Damien Lewis. All instruments were done by Stargate and Vee. Lead and background vocals were provided by Perry. Perry said that "Firework" is her favorite song on Teenage Dream. She explained that:
"Now, people are coming back and almost adopting it as their own anthem, and it's hard, I think, to write an anthem that's not cheesy, and I hope that this could be something in that category. I hope this could be one of those things where it's like, 'Yeah, I want to put my fist up and feel proud and feel strong. But I also don't want to be cheesy, it's a fine line, and I think 'Firework' ... would be like the opus or my one song — if I had to pick a song to play — 'cause it has a great beat. But it also has a fantastic message. Many people refer to the lines 'like the 4th of July'; however the original lyrics were 'like a firefly' as they reminded me of fireworks at night whenever I saw them. However the trend caught on and in live performances I now sing 4th of July, which happens to make great sense for the song name."

According to Perry, "Firework" is influenced by Jack Kerouac's novel, On the Road. The line "Cause baby, you're a firework / Come on, show 'em what you're worth / Make 'em go, awe, awe, awe" is based on Kerouac's line "burn, burn, burn, like fabulous yellow roman candles exploding like spiders across the stars and in the middle you see the blue centerlight pop and everybody goes 'Awww!'"

"Firework" is a dance-pop song. The song is composed in the key of A major and is set in time signature of common time with a tempo of 124 beats per minute. Perry's vocal range spans from A3 to E5.

Critical reception
MTV praised Perry's vocals, though felt the lyrics were "clunky". Slant Magazine stated that the song is "not an actively painful listen. Sure, the would-be inspirational lyrics ('Baby you're a firework/Come on show them what you're worth') are nonsensical, ... but the chorus gains some momentum and the song would work well enough in a club setting that you could forgive its otherwise glaring weaknesses." Stephen Thomas Erlewine of AllMusic chose "Firework" among the top tracks on the album, Nick Levine of Digital Spy gave the song five out of five stars, calling it "a straight up self-empowerment anthem wrapped in a Coldplay-on-poppers club banger from the Stargate team. " PopMatters wrote that "Firework" is "the record's last hurrah; though nothing particularly memorable.....'Firework' has at least a bit of staying power". The Washington Post described the song as "too mushy". Al Fox of BBC Music said that the song "displays a breezy maturity and serious set of pipes, a true demonstration of Perry's musicianship without contradicting the kittenish mischief of the bigger picture." The song was nominated for Grammy Award for Record of the Year at the 54th Grammy Awards but lost to Adele's "Rolling in the Deep".

Chart performance
In the United States, "Firework" debuted at position 57 on the issue dated November 6, 2010. On the issue dated December 18, 2010, it reached number one on the Billboard Hot 100, becoming Perry's fourth number-one single in the US and third number-one single from the album. This made Perry the first female artist since Monica to have three consecutive singles from an album top the chart. It spent four non-consecutive weeks at number one on the Hot 100. The song topped on Hot Dance Club Songs, Pop chart, Adult Pop Songs and Adult Contemporary chart. On the week ending January 8, 2011, "Firework" sold 509,000 digital downloads in the US which is tied with Lady Gaga's "Born This Way" as the seventh highest amount ever sold by a female artist behind Adele's "Hello" (1.1 million), Taylor Swift's "We Are Never Ever Getting Back Together" (623,000) and Kesha's "Tik Tok" (610,000), Swift's "I Knew You Were Trouble" (582,000), Perry's own "Roar" (557,000), Swift's "Shake It Off" (544,000) and ninth highest overall. The song was certified 12× platinum by the Recording Industry Association of America (RIAA). In 2014, she became the first artist in digital history to sell 5 million or more copies of six different songs with "Firework", "Hot n Cold", "California Gurls", "ET", "Roar", and "Dark Horse". As of August 2020, the song has sold 7,400,000 copies in the United States.

In Canada, "Firework" debuted at number 51 on the Canadian Hot 100 issue dated November 6, 2010 and reached number one on December 18, 2010. On October 31, 2010, "Firework" debuted at number 37 in Australia on the official ARIA Singles Chart and moved to number 15 the next week. It peaked at number three and was certified six-times platinum by the Australian Recording Industry Association (ARIA) for sales over 350,000 copies. The song debuted at number 34 in New Zealand on October 4, 2010 and reached number one.

The song entered at number five on the UK Singles Chart and peaked at number three. "Firework" became Perry's first song to sell over one million copies in the United Kingdom, and has sold a total of 1,091,743 copies in the nation as of February 2017. It has also been certified triple platinum by the British Phonographic Industry (BPI). Across Europe, the song reached the top five in Germany, Austria, Belgium, Italy, Norway, Sweden, and Switzerland, while reaching the top ten in France and the Netherlands.

Music video

Development and release

The video is part of a cross-promotional deal with European telecommunications group Deutsche Telekom. Deutsche Telekom hosted a series of activities and competitions from which fans around Europe would be recruited to be in the video. MTV reported that Perry started filming the video on September 28, 2010. The video was directed by Dave Meyers, choreographed by Natricia Bernard, and shot in Budapest. The official teaser trailer of the music video was released on October 15, 2010. An open casting call for the music video drew an unprecedented 38,000 applicants. Perry dedicated it to the It Gets Better Project. The video was released on TwitVid, DirectLyrics, and Youku on October 28, 2010. It premiered on October 28, 2010, on YouTube, and as of November 2022, has amassed more than 1.2 billion views. It was presented in the anamorphic widescreen 2.35:1 aspect ratio.

Synopsis
Perry opens the video gazing down upon the city from a balcony. As she sings into the night, fireworks burst from her soul and soon inspire young people throughout the city to overcome their fears and insecurities, in the process igniting their own fireworks. A boy confronts his parents, who are in a heated argument and upsetting his little sister, and pushes them apart. A shy overweight girl, playing the role of wallflower at a pool party, finds the courage to shed her clothes and jump in the pool with her friends. A leukemia patient at a children's hospital proves to herself that she can show herself out on the street and in public despite her loss of hair. A closeted teenage boy approaches his male friend in a club and kisses him. A struggling young performer walking home in a dark alley uses tricks from his magic act to win over a group of street toughs who were trying to rob him. Soon the youth of the city are converging upon the courtyard of Buda Castle, dancing and lighting up the night with their fireworks, as the camera pans up to the sky for their popping sounds, ending the video.

Reception
On MuchMusic's top 50 videos of 2010, "Firework" was ranked No. 1. The video won Video of the Year at the 2011 MTV Video Music Awards and was nominated for Best Female Video and the newly introduced Best Video with a Message category.

Live performances

Perry performed "Firework" live for the first time on the Late Show with David Letterman on August 24, 2010. On November 7, 2010, she performed the song at the 2010 MTV Europe Music Awards held in Madrid, Spain on November 7, 2010, in an outdoor performance in the front of the Puerta de Alcalá monument. Perry also performed the song again in the United Kingdom, this time on the chat show Paul O'Grady Live on November 12, 2010, the BBC Radio 1 Teen Awards on November 14, 2010, and at the American Music Awards of 2010. She performed "Firework" at the 2010 annual Victoria's Secret Fashion Show which aired on November 30, 2010. Perry's performance of "Firework" on Willkommen bei Mario Barth aired December 4, 2010, in Germany, a performance that was recorded in October 2010. She appeared on The Ellen DeGeneres Show on December 8, 2010, to perform an acoustic version of the song. Also, she performed the song in the 2010 VH1 Divas show at the closing of the event. Perry also performed the acoustic version on the 12th Annual A Home for the Holidays special on CBS.

On May 1, 2011, Perry sang "Firework" at the 53rd TV Week Logie Awards in Australia. The song is featured on the set list of the California Dreams Tour. Perry performed the song at as part of a Live Lounge special for BBC Radio 1's Fearne Cotton on March 19, 2012, along with "Part of Me", "The One That Got Away", "Thinking of You" and "Niggas in Paris". On October 13, 2012, Perry performed the song as a duet with Jodi DiPiazza, an 11-year-old girl with autism, as part of the Night of Too Many Stars benefit, later broadcast on Comedy Central. For Obama's 2012 presidential candidacy, Perry performed several of her hit songs dressed as a ballot, including "Teenage Dream", "Firework", and "Wide Awake". Expressing solidarity for his campaign, the box next to Obama's name was shaded.

Perry was the headliner of Super Bowl XLIX halftime show, which took place on February 1, 2015, and "Firework" was the last song of the performance.

On January 20, 2021, Perry performed the song in front of the Lincoln Memorial during the "Celebrating America" inaugural concert special commemorating the Inauguration of Joe Biden as the 46th President of the United States, closing out the show. A massive firework display was coordinated to appear near the Washington Monument, to serve as a backdrop for her performance.

Cover versions and usage in media
"Firework" was used in Madagascar 3: Europe's Most Wanted, in the movie's 3D circus effects, the biggest of the Madagascar movie sequels.
"Firework" was used prominently in two key dramatic scenes in the French film Rust and Bone, starring Marion Cotillard.
It is one of the main songs featured in the 2014 political action-comedy film The Interview starring James Franco and Seth Rogen.
"Firework" is referenced in the ninth episode of Unbreakable Kimmy Schmidt, when Titus tries to convince Kimmy he wrote the song himself.
Jon Jafari covered the song in February 2016, promising to do so if his goal of $25,000 was reached during a charity Twitch livestream.
"Firework" was the first song played after Hillary Clinton accepted the Democratic presidential nomination at the 2016 Democratic National Convention.
In 2017, international symphonic metal supergroup Exit Eden covered "Firework".
It was featured on the "lipsync for your life" segment in the twelfth season of RuPaul's Drag Race, being performed by contestants Widow Von'Du and Jackie Cox.
"Firework" was played in the episode "Old White Men" of The Dropout on the radio in a car.

Track listing

Digital download
 "Firework" 3:47
 "Firework" (Music video) 3:55

 CD single
 "Firework" 3:48
 "Firework" (Instrumental) 3:51

Credits and personnel
Credits adapted from the Teenage Dream liner notes.

 Katy Perry — vocals, songwriting
 Stargate — instrumentation, production
 Mikkel S. Eriksen — songwriting, recording
 Tor Erik Hermansen — songwriting
 Sandy Vee — songwriting, instrumentation, production, mixing
 Ester Dean — songwriting
 Carlos Oyandel — additional engineering
 Damien Lewis — additional engineering
 Josh Houghkirk — additional engineering assistant
 Phil Tan — mixing
 Brian Gardner — mastering

Charts

Weekly charts

Year-end charts

Decade-end charts

All-time charts

Certifications

Release history

See also

List of best-selling singles in the United States
List of number-one singles from the 2010s (New Zealand)
List of Canadian Hot 100 number-one singles of 2010
List of Billboard Hot 100 number ones of 2010
List of Billboard Hot 100 number ones of 2011
List of Billboard Mainstream Top 40 number-one songs of 2011
List of Billboard Dance Club Songs number ones of 2011
List of number-one dance airplay hits of 2011 (U.S.)
List of Billboard Adult Top 40 number-one songs of the 2010s
List of Billboard Adult Contemporary number ones of 2011

References

2010 singles
Billboard Hot 100 number-one singles
Canadian Hot 100 number-one singles
Budapest in fiction
American dance-pop songs
Katy Perry songs
LGBT-related songs
MTV Video of the Year Award
Music videos directed by Dave Meyers (director)
Number-one singles in New Zealand
Record Report Pop Rock General number-one singles
Song recordings produced by Sandy Vee
Song recordings produced by Stargate (record producers)
Songs written by Ester Dean
Songs written by Katy Perry
Songs written by Sandy Vee
Songs written by Tor Erik Hermansen
Songs written by Mikkel Storleer Eriksen
2010 songs
Capitol Records singles